Gloria Foster (November 15, 1933 – September 29, 2001) was an American actress. She had acclaimed roles in plays In White America and Having Our Say, winning three Obie Awards during her career. Foster played the Oracle in The Matrix (1999) and The Matrix Reloaded (2003) films, the latter film being her last. Foster played the role of the mother of Yusef Bell in the mini series The Atlanta Child Murders which aired in 1985.

Biography

Early life and education
Foster was born on November 15, 1933, in Chicago, Illinois. As a young child, Foster was put into the custody of her maternal grandparents. Foster never knew who her father was and she moved to Janesville, Wisconsin after her mother was hospitalized for a mental illness.  

Foster attended the University of Illinois at Chicago, where she participated in plays, but did not focus on acting. Foster decided to be a professional actor when her godmother introduced her to the Goodman Theatre in Chicago. Foster became one of the few African Americans at the Goodman School of Drama at the Art Institute of Chicago (now at DePaul University). During her studying at the Goodman School she also, "learned professional acting skills in the Court Theater at the University of Chicago". One of her most influential instructors was Bella Itkin, who cast Gloria in many classical roles.

Career
Foster began acting  on Broadway in 1963. Her first role was Ruth in the show of A Raisin in the Sun. Her first professional performance was In White America.  Foster, "play[s] a 13-year-old Arkansas girl who tries to enter her Little Rock school".  She won an Obie Award or Off-Broadway Theater Award. Instead having to audition for roles, people started to make parts for her to be in. Foster was known for her work with Joe Papp, and appeared in his productions of Long Day's Journey into Night, Chekhov's Cherry Orchard, Brecht's Mother Courage (adapted by Ntozake Shange), and Shakespeare's Coriolanus. Foster searched for roles in which she could perform to the best of her ability.  She once said, "Young people today, I think, are thinking in terms of stepping stones.…I don't know that I ever thought that way. It sounds ridiculous, but I was always thinking in terms of a more difficult role".

Highlights
Moving from the New York stage, Gloria Foster started to do roles on the big screen. She was in many theatrical performances and also performed some roles on television. The Cool World (1964) – This was Gloria Foster's first appearance on a full-length feature film.  She played Mrs. Custis.  It was on the set of this film that she starred next to her future husband, Clarence Williams III. Nothing But a Man (1964) – Gloria Foster plays a woman named Lee, who lives with the main character's (Duff Anderson) father. She was also active in television, appearing in such programs as I Spy, two episodes of Law & Order and The Cosby Show (1987).

Her character in both Law and Order episodes, named Satima Tate, was based on the widow of Malcolm X, Betty Shabazz. The first episode, titled Conspiracy (1992), was based on Malcolm X's assassination. Malcolm X was played by Hal Miller.  The second episode, titled Entrapment (1997), focused on her character's children's acts of revenge against the people they believed were really responsible. She returned to theatre again in 1995, acting alongside Mary Alice (who was later to replace her in The Matrix films following her death), appearing as 103-year-old Sadie Delany, in Having Our Say, on Broadway at the Booth Theatre, for which she received rave reviews. The Matrix (1999) and The Matrix Reloaded (2003) – She played the Oracle, however, she died during filming and was thus unable to portray her role in the third film. As a result, Mary Alice replaced her in The Matrix Revolutions and Enter the Matrix.

Personal life and death
 Foster married the actor Clarence Williams III in 1967. They appeared on an episode of Williams's television show The Mod Squad that ran from 1968 to 1973; Foster made two guest appearances. The two acted together in a 1964 film, The Cool World.  Williams was the one to announce her death in 2001.  While Foster did not have many close relatives,  she stayed in contact with her Delta Sigma Theta sorority sister, Cicely Tyson. Tyson stated that, although they did not see each other often, their telephone conversations would often last for hours.

Gloria Foster died on September 29, 2001, at age 67. The cause of her death was diabetes.  A memorial was held at Cypress Hills Cemetery in Brooklyn on October 15, 2001.  Martin Duberman, the author of In White America, told the audience about her 1963 performance that, "she embodied it. At the end of the scene each night, there were tears streaming down her face, her body was trembling, but her dignity was intact ... Foster had to be covered with blankets in order to calm her shaking". 

Foster was a self-described lifelong Democrat and a practicing Methodist.

Filmography

Film
 The Cool World (1964) as Mrs. Custis
 Nothing But a Man (1964) as Lee
 The Comedians (1967) as Mrs. Philipot
 The Angel Levine (1970) as Sally
 Man and Boy (1972) as Ivy Revers
 Leonard Part 6 (1987) as Medusa
 City of Hope (1991) as Jeanette
 The Matrix (1999) as The Oracle
 The Matrix Reloaded (2003) as The Oracle (posthumous release)
 The Matrix Resurrections (2021) as The Oracle (archive footage)

Television
 The Bill Cosby Show as Dolores Winters
 I Spy (1968) as Shana
 The Outcasts (1968), "Take Your Lover in The Ring", Episode #5, as Sabina
 Mod Squad (1969) as Jenny
 To All My Friends on Shore (1972) as Serena
 Top Secret (1978) as Judith
 The Files on Jill Hatch (1983) as Mrs. Hatch
 House of Dies Drear (1984) as Sheila Small
 The Atlanta Child Murders (1985) (miniseries) as Camille Bell
 The Cosby Show (1987) as Dr. Barbara Bracy
 Separate but Equal (1991) as Buster
 Law & Order (1992 and 1997) as Mrs. Tate
 Percy & Thunder (1993) as Sugar Brown

References

External links

 Gloria Foster Biography, UMass.
 Gloria Foster Biography, New York Times.
 Gloria Is The Glory, New York Times, March 26, 1972.

1933 births
2001 deaths
Burials at Cypress Hills Cemetery
Deaths from diabetes
Actresses from Chicago
Actresses from Wisconsin
Obie Award recipients
University of Illinois alumni
DePaul University alumni
20th-century American actresses
21st-century American actresses
African-American actresses
American television actresses
American film actresses
American stage actresses
Delta Sigma Theta members
People from Janesville, Wisconsin
20th-century African-American women
20th-century African-American people
21st-century African-American women
21st-century African-American people
American Methodists
California Democrats
Wisconsin Democrats
Illinois Democrats